Jørstadmoen is a village in Lillehammer Municipality in Innlandet county, Norway.

The village is the site of the Jørstadmoen leir, a military base that is the main base for the Norwegian Cyber Defence Force as well as the Cyber Engineer Academy. The village also has a school, grocery store, and sports facilities.

References

Lillehammer
Villages in Innlandet
Populated places on the Gudbrandsdalslågen